Cuba Libre is a 1998 historical novel written by Elmore Leonard. The story takes place in 1898, immediately before the outbreak of the Spanish–American War.

Plot summary
Ben Tyler, a cowboy and sometime bank robber, is released from prison and is recruited by his old boss to ship a string of horses to a rich American sugar baron in Cuba. Their ship arrives in Havana harbor shortly after the explosive destruction of the warship USS Maine, amid rumors that war between Spain and the United States of America is imminent.

References

1998 American novels
Novels by Elmore Leonard
Historical novels
Novels set in Cuba
Fiction set in 1898
Spanish–American War fiction
Novels set in the 1890s
Novels about rebels
Books with cover art by Chip Kidd